Diarsia stictica is a moth of the family Noctuidae. It is found in India, western China and Borneo.

External links
 Species info

Diarsia